AllianceHealth Durant, is a hospital located at 1800 University Boulevard in Durant, Oklahoma. The hospital was founded in 1987, replacing the older Bryan Memorial Hospital.

It was formerly known as the Medical Center of Southeastern Oklahoma.

Capabilities

AllianceHealth Durant has over 100 physicians on staff.  It is a subsidiary of Community Health Systems. Is a general medical and surgical hospital.

Offers specialized inpatient and outpatient birthing rooms, 20 bed ER.

100 full-time registered nurses, 40 part-time registered nurses, 54 full-time LPNs, 20 part-time LPNs, 2 Certified Emergency Nurses.

References

Further reading
History - AllianceHealth Durant

External links
AllianceHealth Durant

Hospital buildings completed in 1987
Buildings and structures in Bryan County, Oklahoma
Hospitals in Oklahoma
Community Health Systems